Yelisey Ivanovich Goryachev (1892 – December 12, 1938) was a Soviet Komkor (corps commander). He fought in the Imperial Russian Army in World War I before going over to the Bolsheviks. 

He was a recipient of the Order of the Red Banner. During the Great Purge, he was one of the military judges in the Case of Trotskyist Anti-Soviet Military Organization of Marshal Mikhail Tukhachevsky on June 11, 1937. On February 4, 1938, Goryachev was formally promoted to Komkor and was named as commander of the cavalry army in Kiev on July 26, 1938. Fearing arrest, he committed suicide by shooting himself in Khmelnytskyi, Ukraine.

Bibliography
 Жуков Г. К. Воспоминания и размышления. В трёх томах. Десятое издание, дополненное по рукописи автора. Издательство «Новости». Москва, 1990. С.274-277.
 Горбатов А. В. Годы и войны. — М.: Воениздат, 1989. С.102. Книга на сайте: http://militera.lib.ru/memo/russian/gorbatov/index.html
 
 
 
 http://www.budenney.ru/memoirs/2_09.html Будённый Семён Михайлович. Воспоминания. Глава 9. Даёшь Новоград-Волынский.

External links
 Репрессированные военнослужащие Красной армии. Комкоры.
 4 кавалерийская дивизия, с 01.23 г. — 3-я кавалерийская Бессарабская ордена Ленина, дважды Краснознаменная дивизия имени т. Котовского, Великую Отечественную войну закончила как — 5-я гвардейская кавалерийская Бессарабско-Танненбергская ордена Ленина, дважды Краснознаменная, ордена Суворова дивизия.
 ПРИКАЗ НАРОДНОГО КОМИССАРА ОБОРОНЫ СОЮЗА ССР ПО ЛИЧНОМУ СОСТАВУ АРМИИ 20 ноября 1935 года № 2395 КОМДИВ ГОРЯЧЕВ Елисей Иванович
 7-я кавалерийская Самарская Краснознаменная дивизия имени Английского пролетариата
 6-й кавалерийский корпус

1892 births
1938 deaths
Russian military personnel of World War I
Soviet military personnel of the Russian Civil War
Suicides by firearm in the Soviet Union
Russian military personnel who committed suicide
Soviet komkors
1938 suicides